Lucky is a 2020 American horror film directed by Natasha Kermani, from a screenplay by Brea Grant, who also stars in the leading role. The film premiered at the Fantasia International Film Festival on August 23, 2020, and on Shudder on March 4, 2021.

Synopsis 
Life takes a sudden turn for May, a popular self-help book author, when she finds herself the target of a mysterious man with murderous intentions. Every night, without fail he comes after her, and every day the people around her barely seem to notice. With no one to turn to, May is pushed to her limits and must take matters into her own hands to survive and to regain control of her life.

Cast and characters
 Brea Grant as May
 Leith M. Burke as Rob
 Dhruv Uday Singh as Ted
 Hunter C. Smith as "The Man"

Release
Lucky was originally slated to launch as part of the Midnighters program at the 2020 South by Southwest Film Festival, which was officially canceled due to the COVID-19 pandemic in Austin, Texas. The film premiered at the Fantasia International Film Festival on August 23, 2020. It premiered on Shudder on March 4, 2021, and it was released on VOD by RLJ Entertainment on August 3, 2021.

Reception

Box office
Lucky grossed $2,045 with home video sales.

Critical response
On review aggregator Rotten Tomatoes, the film holds an approval rating of 93% based on 68 reviews, with an average score of 7.1/10. The website's critical consensus reads, "A rich blend of thrilling horror and sharp social commentary, Lucky acts like a bloody good calling card for director Natasha Kermani and writer-star Brea Grant."  On Metacritic, the film holds a weighted average score of 75 out of 100 based on 7 critics, indicating "generally favorable reviews".

References

External links
 
 

2020s English-language films
2020s American films
American horror films
Films about stalking
Home invasions in film
Time loop films